

L03A Immunostimulants

L03AA Colony stimulating factors
L03AA02 Filgrastim
L03AA03 Molgramostim
L03AA09 Sargramostim
L03AA10 Lenograstim
L03AA12 Ancestim
L03AA13 Pegfilgrastim
L03AA14 Lipegfilgrastim
L03AA15 Balugrastim
L03AA16 Empegfilgrastim
L03AA17 Pegteograstim
L03AA18 Efbemalenograstim alfa
QL03AA90 Pegbovigrastim

L03AB Interferons

L03AB01 Interferon alfa natural
L03AB02 Interferon beta natural
L03AB03 Interferon gamma
L03AB04 Interferon alfa-2a
L03AB05 Interferon alfa-2b
L03AB06 Interferon alfa-n1
L03AB07 Interferon beta-1a
L03AB08 Interferon beta-1b
L03AB09 Interferon alfacon-1
L03AB10 Peginterferon alfa-2b
L03AB11 Peginterferon alfa-2a
L03AB12 Albinterferon alfa-2b
L03AB13 Peginterferon beta-1a
L03AB14 Cepeginterferon alfa-2b
L03AB15 Ropeginterferon alfa-2b
L03AB16 Peginterferon alfacon-2
L03AB60 Peginterferon alfa-2b, combinations
L03AB61 Peginterferon alfa-2a, combinations
QL03AB90 Interferom omega, feline origin

L03AC Interleukins
L03AC01 Aldesleukin
L03AC02 Oprelvekin

L03AX Other immunostimulants
L03AX01 Lentinan
L03AX02 Roquinimex
L03AX03 BCG vaccine
L03AX04 Pegademase
L03AX05 Pidotimod
L03AX07 Poly I:C
L03AX08 Poly ICLC
L03AX09 Thymopentin
L03AX10 Immunocyanin
L03AX11 Tasonermin
L03AX12 Melanoma vaccine
L03AX13 Glatiramer acetate
L03AX14 Histamine dihydrochloride
L03AX15 Mifamurtide
L03AX16 Plerixafor
L03AX17 Sipuleucel-T
L03AX18 Cridanimod
L03AX19 Dasiprotimut-T
L03AX21 Elapegademase
QL03AX90 Feline interleukin-2 recombinant canarypox virus (viral vector)

References

L03